Újezdec is a municipality and village in Svitavy District in the Pardubice Region of the Czech Republic. It has about 100 inhabitants.

Sights
Újezdec is known for Růžový palouček ("Rose Meadow"). It is a memorable place with Monument to the Czech Brethren. According to legend, it is the place where the Czech Brethren said their last goodbyes to their homeland, before their departure abroad. The memorable place was created in 1906, the monument was raised in 1921, and the park around the place was founded in 1925.

References

Villages in Svitavy District